Rockwell Green is a village near Wellington, in the Somerset West and Taunton district of Somerset, England. It lies just east of the Somerset-Devon border and is overlooked by the Blackdown Hills.

The Wellington Monument is visible from almost anywhere in the village. The monument is on the verge of collapsing, but is to be substantially rebuilt at the cost of up to £4 million by the National Trust.

Rockwell Green has a railway bridge, under which a steam train, the City of Truro, was first recorded travelling at over 100 mph (160 km/h) in 1904.  Although this has been the subject of much debate since then, recent research supports the claim. There have been numerous requests for a plaque or monument to be placed at the Beam Bridge hotel or Westford rail bridge: however very little has come of this so far.

Two large water towers, both disused, bring a small number of visitors to the village. The older  (redbrick) tower was built in the late 19th century and includes a circular steel tank. It has been designated by English Heritage as a Grade II listed building. The more recent concrete tower was built in the 1930s.

A number of houses in the original village are council owned. In 1991 the population was estimated at 1,618. Since then more houses have been built and the population estimate from the 2001 census was 2,246. The population estimate in 2016 was 2,945.

The village has a butcher's shop, one pub, a fish and chip shop, a post office, a general store, a church, a beauty salon/hairdressers, a primary school and pre school, a village hall, and a post office; before moving to Exeter Road the post office was on the east side of Rockwell Green, in a 19th-century building that has been demolished.

References

Villages in Taunton Deane
Wellington, Somerset